Jørn Blach is a Danish curler.

At the national level, he is a two-time Danish men's champion curler.

Teams

References

External links
 

Living people
Danish male curlers
Danish curling champions
Year of birth missing (living people)
Place of birth missing (living people)